Babel-17 is a 1966 science fiction novel by American writer Samuel R. Delany in which the Sapir–Whorf hypothesis (that language influences thought and perception) plays an important part. It was joint winner of the Nebula Award for Best Novel in 1967 (with Flowers for Algernon) and was also nominated for the Hugo Award for Best Novel in 1967.

Delany hoped to have Babel-17 originally published as a single volume with the novella Empire Star, but this did not happen until a 2001 reprint.

Plot summary
Babel-17 is a language that can be used as a weapon utilized by enemy invaders during an interstellar war. Chinese starship captain, linguist, poet, and telepath Rydra Wong begins to learn the language. After several attacks have been made by the invaders who speak Babel-17, she soon realizes the potential of the language to change one's thought process and provide speakers with certain powers, and she is recruited by her government to discover how the enemy is infiltrating and sabotaging strategic sites. As her understanding of the language increases, she is able to predict where the next attack will be and gathers a team to go to the predicted location of the attack. 

Initially Babel-17 is thought to be a code used by enemy agents. Rydra realizes it is a language in and of itself. During their mission, Rydra realizes there is a traitor aboard the ship. After escaping the predicted attack, Rydra and her crew are captured by a nearby planet. While on the planet, Rydra meets a man called "The Butcher" who does not use the word "I." After teaching The Butcher the word "I," Rydra, The Butcher, and her crew leave the planet but are attacked once they disembark. Rydra and The Butcher, who already unknowingly spoke Babel-17, are rescued but seem incredibly altered. While their bodies are present, their minds seem elsewhere. Their ability to speak Babel-17 has altered their minds and we learn that it was Rydra who was the traitor on board the ship. Babel-17 is discovered to be a language that not only helps you understand the enemy, but become the enemy.

The novel deals with several issues related to the peculiarities of language, how conditions of life shape the formation of words and meaning, and how words themselves can shape the actions of people.

Influence
Delany's novel influenced a generation of writers: Native Tongue by Suzette Haden Elgin, The Dispossessed by Ursula K. Le Guin, Embassytown by China Miéville, "In Luna Bore Coda" by Joshua Nilles, and, more evidently, the short story "Story of Your Life" by Ted Chiang. Language as a weapon was adapted as a plot device in Neal Stephenson's Snow Crash. It also resembles a few preceding science fiction novels which deal with how languages shape the political and cultural stratum of societies, such as The Languages of Pao by Jack Vance or Anthem by Ayn Rand.

Language of Babel-17 
The language portrayed at the center of Babel-17 contains interesting linguistic features including the absence of a pronoun or any other construction for "I". The heroine finds her perceptions (and even her physical abilities) altered once she has learned Babel-17. Babel-17 also seems to alter the worldview of those who speak it. When Rydra speaks in Babel-17, times slows down because she is able to communicate with much more precision. The language also not only allows one to express ideas much quicker but seems to also change one's worldview. 

Delany describes himself as having been "a die-hard believer in the Sapir-Whorf", which was in the air at the time, without his ever having heard the term; eventually, once he read about it, he decided that "it was just incorrect", because "it fails to take into account the whole economy of discourse, which is a linguistic level that accomplishes lots of the soft-edge conceptual contouring around ideas, whether we have available a one- or two-word name for it or only a set of informal many-word descriptions that are not completely fixed", which motivated his later works considering language: "The realization of the flaws in the Sapir-Whorf, in that they caused me to begin considering the more complex linguistic mechanisms of discourse, you might say gave me my lifetime project."

Other media
In 2014, the work Babel-17 was told in tandem with a partial biography of Samuel R. Delany's early years in the form of a play The Motion of Light in Water, based on a 1988 autobiography with the same title, produced by Elbow Room, an Australian theatre company directed by Marcel Dorney.

Rush drummer and lyricist Neil Peart noted that Babel-17 was one of his early literary influences, and was an important part of the crafting of the band's hugely successful 2112 album.

References

Sources

External links
 Errata for Babel-17, approved by the author.
 2009 retrospective review by Jo Walton: "Babel 17 was published in 1966, the year in which I learned to talk."
 
 Babel-17 at Worlds Without End

1966 American novels
1966 science fiction novels
Ace Books books
American novels adapted into plays
American philosophical novels
Language in fiction
Nebula Award for Best Novel-winning works
Novels by Samuel Delany